Franklin José Lucena Peña (born 20 February 1981) is a Venezuelan footballer that currently plays for Portuguesa FC as a defensive midfielder.

Honours

Club
Caracas
 Torneo de Apertura (1): 2007
 Torneo de Clausura (2): 2009, 2010
 Copa Venezuela (1): 2009

International
 Copa América (1): Fourth place 2011

External links
 Franklin Lucena at Football-Lineups
 
 

1981 births
Living people
People from Acarigua
Association football midfielders
Venezuelan footballers
Venezuela international footballers
Deportivo Táchira F.C. players
Caracas FC players
Deportivo La Guaira players
Once Caldas footballers
2011 Copa América players
2015 Copa América players